Raising a Flag over the Reichstag is an iconic World War II photograph, taken during the Battle of Berlin on 2 May 1945. The photograph was reprinted in thousands of publications and came to be regarded around the world as one of the most significant and recognizable images of World War II. Owing to the secrecy of Soviet media, the identities of the men in the picture were often disputed, as was that of the photographer, Yevgeny Khaldei. It became a symbol of the Soviet victory over Nazi Germany.

Background

The Battle of Berlin was the final major offensive of the European theatre of World War II and was designated the Berlin Strategic Offensive Operation by the Soviet Union. Starting on 16 April 1945, the Red Army breached the German front as a result of the Vistula–Oder offensive and rapidly advanced westward through Germany, as fast as 30–40 kilometres a day. The offensive culminated in the battle in Berlin, which lasted from late 20 April 1945 until 2 May and was one of the bloodiest battles in history.

Erected in 1894, the Reichstag building, the historic seat of the German national legislature, was among the most recognizable buildings in Germany, with architecture considered magnificent for its time. The building contributed much to German history and was considered by the Red Army to be the symbol of their fascist enemy. To the Nazis, however, the Reichstag was instead a symbol of the weaknesses of democracy and representative government. It was severely damaged in the Reichstag fire of 1933, and by 1945 had been closed for 12 years, essentially the entirety of the Nazi reign; all subsequent meetings of the Reichstag legislature (which grew increasingly infrequent in the years following the fire as Nazi decision-making was centralized with Adolf Hitler) had been convened at the nearby Kroll Opera House instead. After fierce combat within its walls, the Soviets finally captured the Reichstag on 2 May 1945.

Taking the photograph
The Reichstag was seen as symbolic of, and at the heart of, Nazi Germany. It was arguably the most symbolic target in Berlin. The events surrounding the flag-raising are murky due to the confusion of the fight at the building. On 30 April there was great pressure from Stalin to take the building, in time for the International Workers' Day, 1 May. Initially, two planes dropped several large red banners on the roof that appeared to have caught on the bombed-out dome. Additionally, a number of reports had reached headquarters that two parties, M. M. Bondar from the 380th Rifle Regiment and Captain V. N. Makov of the 756th might have been able to hoist a flag during the day of 30 April. These reports were received by Marshal G. K. Zhukov, who issued an announcement stating that his troops had captured the Reichstag and hoisted a flag. However, when correspondents arrived, they found no Soviets in the building, but rather they were pinned down outside by German fire. After fierce fighting both outside and inside the building, a flag was raised at 22:40 on 30 April 1945, when 23-year-old Rakhimzhan Qoshqarbaev climbed the building and inserted a flag into the crown of the mounted female statue of "Germania", symbolizing Germany. As this happened at night, it was too dark to take a photograph. The next day the flag was taken down by the Germans. The Red Army finally gained control of the entire building on 2 May.

On 2 May 1945, Khaldei scaled the now pacified Reichstag to take his picture. He was carrying with him a large flag, sewn from three tablecloths for this very purpose, by his uncle. The official story would later be that two hand-picked soldiers, Meliton Kantaria (Georgian) and Mikhail Yegorov (Russian), raised the Soviet flag over the Reichstag, and the photograph would often be used as depicting the event. Some authors state that for political reasons the subjects of the photograph were changed and the actual man to hoist the flag was Aleksei Kovalev. 
However, according to Khaldei himself, when he arrived at the Reichstag, he simply asked the soldiers who happened to be passing by to help with the staging of the photoshoot; there were only four of them, including Khaldei, on the roof: the one who was attaching the flag was 18-year-old Private Kovalev from Kiev, the two others were Abdulkhakim Ismailov from Dagestan and Leonid Gorychev (also mentioned as Aleksei Goryachev) from Minsk. The photograph was taken with a Leica III rangefinder camera with a 35mm f3.5 lens.

Aftermath
The photo was published 13 May 1945 in the Ogonyok magazine. While many photographers took pictures of flags on the roof, it was Khaldei's image that stuck.

Editing

After taking the symbolic photo, Khaldei quickly returned to Moscow. He further edited the image at the request of the editor-in-chief of the Ogonyok, who noticed that Senior Sergeant Abdulkhakim Ismailov, who is supporting the flag-bearer, was wearing two watches, which could imply he had looted one of them, an action punishable by execution. Using a needle, Khaldei removed the watch from the right wrist. Later, it was claimed that the extra watch was actually an Adrianov compass and that Khaldei, in order to avoid controversy, doctored the photo to remove the watch from Ismailov's right wrist. He also added smoke in the background, copying it from another picture to make the scene more dramatic.

Copyrights 
Because Khaldei worked in TASS from October 25, 1936 to October 7, 1948, his TASS photoworks, including "Raising a Flag over the Reichstag", are in public domain in Russia no later than January 1, 2019, because they were copyrighted by TASS, and such copyrights of a legal entity expire no later than 70 years after publication (or creation, if work was not published in proper time). It was confirmed in 2015 in the court session between the heiress of the photographer, his daughter Anna Khaldei and the publishing house «Veche» about the use of the photograph "Raising a Flag over the Reichstag" in the book "Za porogom Pobedy" (Behind the Threshold of the Victory) by Arsen Benikovich Martirosyan, where ITAR-TASS was attracted as a third person.

Gallery

See also
List of photographs considered the most important
Victory Banner (1 May 1945)
Raising the Flag on Iwo Jima (1945)
Raising the Flag on the Three-Country Cairn (1945)
The Ink Flag (1948)
Raising the Flag at Ground Zero (2001)

Annotations

Bibliography

Notes

References

 – Total pages: 48
 – Total pages: 96

 – Total pages: 315
 – Total pages: 584
 – Total pages: 792

 – Total pages: 568

 – Total pages: 265
 – Total pages: 326

Battle of Berlin
Black-and-white photographs
Flags in art
Flags of the Soviet Union
Reichstag building
Special events flags
Works originally published in Russian magazines
World War II photographs
1945 photographs
1945 in art
May 1945 events in Europe